The Fast of Esther is a fast on Purim eve commemorating two communal fasts undertaken by the Persian Jewish community of Shushan in the Book of Esther, for the purpose of praying for salvation from annihilation by an evil decree, which had been the instigated by the royal vizier, an anti-jewish enemy of the Amalekite nation.

This fast, unlike other fasts, is a custom. It is not mentioned in the Talmud, however is mentioned in the Midrash and other later sources from the days of the Gaonim. Therefore it is considered less severe than the other fasts.

Esther asked Mordechai to have the Jews fast and pray on her behalf for 3 days and 3 nights, before she approached her husband, king Ahasuerus to beg for the life of her people.  Another is presumed to have occurred on the 13th of Adar, the day before the Jews fought a battle to defend against their enemies, who had been given an irrevocable permission to murder Jews for one day a year on the 14th of that month, which is now a Jewish holiday of Purim on account of their victory.

Before approaching the king unbidden at risk of her life Esther told Mordechai Go, gather together all the Jews that are present in Shushan, and fast ye for me, and neither eat nor drink three days, night or day; I also and my maidens will fast in like manner; and so will I go in unto the king, which is not according to the law; and if I perish, I perish.

Laws and Customs
The fast is from dawn to dusk.

The first mention of the fast of Esther is as a minhag that is referenced in the Gaonic period. A 2010 study examines the origin of the fast and the reason for its arising in the Gaonic period.

The fast is observed on the 13th day of the Hebrew month of Adar. (When the year has two Adar months, it is observed only in the second Adar). If the date of the Fast of Esther falls on Shabbat (Saturday), the fast is instead observed on the preceding Thursday, as this was the case in 2004, 2007, 2010, 2011, 2013, 2014, and 2017. This will occur again in 2024. (Shulchan Aruch S.686 s.2)

As the fast of Esther is not one of the four public fasts ordained by the Prophets, the laws concerning its observance are more lenient; pregnant women, nursing mothers, and those who are weak are not required to observe it.

Fasting in the Book of Esther
It is generally accepted in the rabbinic tradition that the original three-day "Fast of Esther" mentioned in chapter 4 of Book of Esther occurred on the 14th, 15th, and 16th days of Nisan, these being the eve and first two days of Passover. While halacha normally forbids fasting on Passover, it is believed that Esther reasoned it would be better to fast on one Pesach lest they all be destroyed and thus never be able to observe the holiday in the future. But due to the normal prohibition of fasting on Passover, the "Fast of Esther" instead became attached to the eve of Purim, the 13th of Adar.

The 13th of Adar itself is thought to have been a fast day for the warriors while going out to battle, as it is believed to have been customary to fast during the battle in order to gain divine favor.

Date in the Gregorian calendar
The Gregorian calendar dates correlated with 13 Adar, from dawn until nightfall, for 2021–2026 are:

See also 
 Fasting in Judaism
 Aneinu
 Selichot
 Haman (Bible)
 Amalek

References

External links 

 The month of Adar and the holiday of Purim, minhagim (customs) and halachot (laws) in Peninei Halakha by Rabbi Eliezer Melamed
 Jewish Holidays at Orthodox Union

Adar observances
Esther
Jewish fast days